Calver Hill is a fell in the Yorkshire Dales National Park in North Yorkshire, England. Calver Hill is an area of grouse shooting and the fell is dotted with grouse butts. Most of the drainage from the fell goes north and easterly to join the Arkle Beck in lower Arkengarthdale which eventually joins the River Swale just south of Reeth.

History
Evidence exits on the slopes of Calver Hill that point to use during the Neolithic Period and the Bronze Age. Finds of arrowheads, flints, and field patterns also point to possible areas of habitation. The whole area of Calver Hill is sometimes referred to as Reeth Low Moor, and in some older texts, the name of the hill is recorded as either Mount Calvey, or Calvey Hill. Another alternative name of Mount Calva persists into the modern day.

Older versions of the 1:25,000 Ordnance Survey map show a trig point at the summit of Calver Hill but all there is now is a pile of rubble and mining spoil to form a summit cairn. Lead mining reached its heyday in the 19th century in this area and they were some of the most productive mines in Yorkshire. Calver Hill was a Bole hill a place where the lead from the mines was smelted in an open air furnace which used the prevailing wind to increase the heat. Burnt stones and a scattering of slag show the locations of these furnaces.

In January 1868, the disposal of some nitro-glycerine on top of the hill caused some worry in nearby Reeth and Arkengarthdale as the local population were not informed of the impending explosion. The blast caused debris to extend over  our from the centre, and local people thought they were under attack.

Walks

Calver Hill can be climbed from Reeth or from Langthwaite and Arkle Town in Arkengarthdale.

References

Sources

Peaks of the Yorkshire Dales